Junior Hochou Hore (born 30 December 2000) is an Ivorian footballer who plays as a defender.

Career statistics

Club

External links

References

2000 births
Living people
Ivorian footballers
Ivorian expatriate footballers
Hatta Club players
UAE Pro League players
UAE First Division League players
Association football defenders
Expatriate footballers in the United Arab Emirates
Ivorian expatriate sportspeople in the United Arab Emirates
Place of birth missing (living people)